The Bordeaux Wine Official Classification of 1855 resulted from the 1855 Exposition Universelle de Paris, when Emperor Napoleon III requested a classification system for France's best Bordeaux wines that were to be on display for visitors from around the world. Brokers from the wine industry ranked the wines according to a château's reputation and trading price, which at that time was directly related to quality.

The wines were ranked in importance from first to fifth growths (crus). All of the red wines that made it on the list came from the Médoc region except for one: Château Haut-Brion from Graves. The white wines, then of much less importance than red wine, were limited to the sweet varieties of Sauternes and Barsac and were ranked only from superior first growth to second growth.

Changes to the classification 
Within each category, the various châteaux are ranked in order of quality and only twice since the 1855 classification has there been a change: first when in 1856 Cantemerle was added as a fifth growth (having either been originally omitted by oversight or added as an afterthought, depending on which of the conflicting accounts is correct) and, more significantly, in 1973, when Château Mouton Rothschild was elevated from a second growth to a first growth vineyard after decades of intense lobbying by the powerful Philippe de Rothschild. A third, but less known "change", is the removal of Château Dubignon, a third growth from Margaux that was absorbed into the estate Château Malescot St. Exupéry.

A superficial change is that since 1855, when only five of the estates were styled with the word "château" in their name, most Bordeaux wine estates now use this nomenclature.

Critique 
As a classification of châteaux, the actual vineyards owned by some wineries have expanded, shrunk and been divided without any reclassification, and considerable plots of valued terroir have changed ownership. Indeed, it is a peculiarity of Bordeaux that as long as a vineyard parcel lies within the boundaries of the wine commune, it is eligible to be used by any chateau, independent of the quality of the parcel itself.

Many wine critics have argued that the 1855 Classification became outdated and does not provide an accurate guide to the quality of the wines being made on each estate. Several proposals have been made for changes to the classification, and a bid for a revision was unsuccessfully attempted in 1960. Alexis Lichine, a member of the 1960 revision panel, launched a campaign to implement changes that lasted over thirty years, in the process publishing several editions of his own unofficial classification and the Alexis Lichine's Guide to the Wines and Vineyards of France, in which he devoted a chapter to the subject. In support of his argument, Lichine cited the case of Chateau Lynch-Bages, the Pauillac Fifth Growth that, through good management and by patiently collecting the best parcels as they come on the market, makes wine that in his view are worthy of a much higher classification. Conversely, poor management can result in a significant decline in quality, as the example of Chateau Margaux shows—the wines it made in the 1960s and 1970s are widely regarded as far below what's expected of a First Growth. Other critics have followed a similar suit, including Robert Parker who published a top 100 Bordeaux estates in 1985 and L'histoire de la vigne & du vin by Bernard and Henri Enjalbert in 1989, as well as efforts made by Clive Coates (MW) and David Peppercorn (MW). Ultimately nothing has come of them; the likely negative impact on prices for any downgraded châteaux and the 1855 establishment's political muscle are considered among the reasons.

In March 2009, the British wine exchange Liv-ex released  The Liv-ex Bordeaux Classification, a modern re-calculation of the 1855 classification, with an aim to apply the original method to the contemporary economical context.

Many of the leading estates from the Médoc appellation that were not included in the 1855 classification are classified as Cru Bourgeois, a classification system that has been updated on a regular basis since 1932, banned in 2007, but reinstated in 2010.

The Médoc Classification of 1855

In French Les Grands Crus classés en 1855. The estates are listed with their commune (village), and their AOC in parenthesis, if different from the commune. The 19th-century names appear as listed by the brokers on April 18, 1855, followed by the modern names, as the use of "second cru" for red wines and "deuxième cru" for white wines.

The Red Wines of the Gironde

First Growths (Premiers Crus)

Château Lafite, now Château Lafite Rothschild, Pauillac
Château Latour, Pauillac
Château Margaux, Margaux
Haut-Brion, now Château Haut-Brion, Pessac, Graves
Mouton, now Château Mouton Rothschild, Pauillac

Second Growths (Deuxièmes Crus)
Rauzan-Ségla, now Château Rauzan-Ségla, Margaux
Rauzan-Gassies, now Château Rauzan-Gassies, Margaux
Léoville, now
Château Léoville-Las Cases, St.-Julien
Château Léoville-Poyferré, St.-Julien
Château Léoville-Barton, St.-Julien
Vivens Durfort, now Château Durfort-Vivens, Margaux
Gruaud-Laroze, now Château Gruaud-Larose, St.-Julien
Lascombes, now Château Lascombes, Margaux
Brane, now Château Brane-Cantenac, Cantenac-Margaux (Margaux)
Pichon Longueville, now
Château Pichon Longueville Baron, Pauillac (commonly known as Pichon Baron)
Château Pichon Longueville Comtesse de Lalande, Pauillac (commonly known as Pichon Lalande or Pichon Comtesse)
Ducru Beau Caillou, now Château Ducru-Beaucaillou, St.-Julien
Cos Destournel, now Château Cos d'Estournel, St.-Estèphe
Montrose, now Château Montrose, St.-Estèphe

Third Growths (Troisièmes Crus)
Kirwan, now Château Kirwan, Cantenac-Margaux (Margaux)
Château d'Issan, Cantenac-Margaux (Margaux)
Lagrange, Château Lagrange, St.-Julien
Langoa, now Château Langoa-Barton, St.-Julien
Giscours, now Château Giscours, Labarde-Margaux (Margaux)
St.-Exupéry, now Château Malescot St. Exupéry, Margaux
Boyd, now
Château Cantenac-Brown, Cantenac-Margaux (Margaux)
Château Boyd-Cantenac, Margaux
Palmer, now Château Palmer, Cantenac-Margaux (Margaux)
Lalagune, now Château La Lagune, Ludon (Haut-Medoc)
Desmirail, now Château Desmirail, Margaux
Dubignon, later Château Dubignon, Margaux
Calon, now Château Calon-Ségur, St.-Estèphe
Ferrière, now Château Ferrière, Margaux
Becker, now Château Marquis d'Alesme Becker, Margaux

Fourth Growths (Quatrièmes Crus)
St.-Pierre, now Château Saint-Pierre, St.-Julien
Talbot, now Château Talbot, St.-Julien
Du-Luc, now Château Branaire-Ducru, St.-Julien
Duhart, now Château Duhart-Milon, Pauillac
Pouget-Lassale and Pouget, both now Château Pouget, Cantenac-Margaux (Margaux)
Carnet, now Château La Tour Carnet, St.-Laurent (Haut-Médoc)
Rochet, now Château Lafon-Rochet, St.-Estèphe
Château de Beychevele, now Château Beychevelle, St.-Julien
Le Prieuré, now Château Prieuré-Lichine, Cantenac-Margaux (Margaux)
Marquis de Thermes, now Château Marquis de Terme, Margaux

Fifth Growths (Cinquièmes Crus)
Canet, now Château Pontet-Canet, Pauillac
Batailley, now
Château Batailley, Pauillac
Château Haut-Batailley, Pauillac
Grand Puy, now Château Grand-Puy-Lacoste, Pauillac
Artigues Arnaud, now Château Grand-Puy-Ducasse, Pauillac
Lynch, now Château Lynch-Bages, Pauillac
Lynch Moussas, now Château Lynch-Moussas, Pauillac
Dauzac, now Château Dauzac, Labarde (Margaux)
Darmailhac, now Château d'Armailhac, Pauillac
Le Tertre, now Château du Tertre, Arsac (Margaux)
Haut Bages, now Château Haut-Bages-Libéral, Pauillac
Pédesclaux, now Château Pédesclaux, Pauillac
Coutenceau, now Château Belgrave, St.-Laurent (Haut-Médoc)
Camensac, now Château de Camensac, St.-Laurent (Haut-Médoc)
Cos Labory, now Château Cos Labory, St.-Estèphe
Clerc Milon, now Château Clerc-Milon, Pauillac
Croizet-Bages, now Château Croizet Bages, Pauillac
Cantemerle, now Château Cantemerle, Macau (Haut-Médoc)

The White Wines of the Gironde
[Barsac estates may be labelled with the appellation Barsac or Sauternes.]

Superior First Growth (Premier Cru Supérieur)
Yquem, now Château d'Yquem, Sauternes

First Growths (Premier Crus)
Latour Blanche, now Château La Tour Blanche, Bommes (Sauternes)
Peyraguey, now
Château Lafaurie-Peyraguey, Bommes (Sauternes)
Château Clos Haut-Peyraguey, Bommes (Sauternes)
Vigneau, now Château de Rayne-Vigneau, Bommes (Sauternes)
Suduiraut, now Château Suduiraut, Preignac (Sauternes)
Coutet, now Château Coutet, Barsac
Climens, now Château Climens, Barsac
Bayle, now Château Guiraud, Sauternes
Rieusec, now Château Rieussec, Fargues (Sauternes)
Rabeaud, now
Château Rabaud-Promis, Bommes (Sauternes)
Château Sigalas-Rabaud, Bommes (Sauternes)

Second Growths (Deuxième Crus)
Mìrat, now Château de Myrat, Barsac
Doisy, now
Château Doisy Daëne, Barsac
Château Doisy-Dubroca, Barsac
Château Doisy-Védrines, Barsac
Pexoto, now part of Château Rabaud-Promis
D’arche, now Château d'Arche, Sauternes
Filhot, now Château Filhot, Sauternes
Broustet Nérac, now
Château Broustet, Barsac
Château Nairac, Barsac
Caillou, now Château Caillou, Barsac
Suau, now Château Suau, Barsac
Malle, now Château de Malle, Preignac (Sauternes)
Romer, now
Château Romer, Fargues (Sauternes)
Château Romer du Hayot,  Fargues (Sauternes)
Lamothe, now
Château Lamothe, Sauternes
Château Lamothe-Guignard, Sauternes

See also
 Classification of Graves wine
 Classification of Saint-Émilion wine
 Regional wine classification
 History of Bordeaux wine
 Bordeaux wine regions
 Judgment of Paris

Notes and references

a.   The only classified estate situated in Graves rather than Médoc. 
b.   Listed as Second Growth in 1855, elevated to First Growth in 1973.  
c.   Dissolved in 1960.  
d.   Added in 1856. 

General

Echikson, Tom (2004). Noble rot. NY: Norton. 
Taber, George M. (2005). Judgment of Paris: California vs. France and the historic 1976 Tasting that Revolutionized Wine. NY: Scribner. 

Footnotes

External links
 Great Growths of 1855 official site

Appellations
Bordeaux wine
1855 establishments in France
Wine classification
Alcohol law in France